The 1974 All-Ireland Senior Ladies' Football Championship was the inaugural championship. On 18 July 1974 the Ladies Gaelic Football Association was founded at a meeting held at the Hayes' Hotel in Thurles, County Tipperary. At the meeting it was agreed to establish a senior Ladies' Gaelic football inter-county championship. Eight GAA counties, including Cork, Kerry, Roscommon, Laois, Offaly, Galway, Waterford and Tipperary, subsequently decided to enter the inaugural championship. The four Munster counties also agreed to play in an inaugural Munster Senior Ladies' Football Championship. Tipperary won both the Munster and All-Ireland championships, defeating Kerry and Offaly in the respective finals.

Munster Championship

Round 1

Round 2

Munster Final

Tipperary qualify for the All-Ireland final.

All-Ireland series

Quarter finals

Notes
  Some accounts say Laois played and defeated Roscommon. Others suggest they received a walkover.

Semi-final

Final

References

Ladies' Football Championship